Cape Verde–People's Republic of China relations refers to the current and historical relationship between the People's Republic of China and Cape Verde. The two states established bilateral relations in April 1976, shortly after Cape Verde gained independence from the Portuguese Empire. Cape Verde is an adherent to PR China's One China Policy. China maintained relations with Cape Verde throughout from 1970s to mid-1990s mainly to prevent the Republic of China (Taiwan) from gaining Cape Verde's international recognition through checkbook diplomacy. However, in the mid-1990s, a number of Chinese capitalists began investing in the island nation and relations grew during the 2000s as a result.

Economic development
Since the first Forum on China Africa Cooperation conference in 2000, the Chinese government has successfully delivered $63.5 million in development finance. These projects include $4.4 million for construction of the Poilão dam in the Santa Cruz, $22 million to build a sports stadium in Monte Vaca, and $2.3 million in debt forgiveness.
During the 2010 Forum for Economic and Trade Cooperation between China and Portuguese speaking countries in Macau, Wen Jiaobao announced the creation of a $1 billion fund aimed at boosting trade between China and Portuguese speaking countries.

Bibliography

References

 
China
Cape Verde
Africa–China relations